Gréta Márton (born 3 October 1999) is a Hungarian handballer for Ferencvárosi TC and the Hungarian national team.

She made her international debut on 2 June 2019 against Austria.

Honours

National team
 IHF Women's Junior World Championship: 
: 2018

Club
Ferencvárosi TC

Nemzeti Bajnokság I:
: 2021
: 2016, 2018, 2019, 2022
Magyar Kupa
: 2022
: 2019
: 2016, 2018, 2021

Individual
 Hungarian Handballer of the Year: 2021

Personal life
In 2022 she graduated from the University of Physical Education and earned a degree in Handball Coaching.

References

External links

 

1999 births
Living people
People from Mohács
Hungarian female handball players
Ferencvárosi TC players (women's handball)
Handball players at the 2020 Summer Olympics
Sportspeople from Baranya County